"This Moment" is a ballad that was released as the debut single of Marie Picasso, the winner of the fourth series of the Swedish singing competition Idol in 2007. The song was written by Swedish songwriters Mårten and Lina Eriksson, and produced by the former. The song debuted and peaked at number one on the Swedish Singles Chart, holding the top spot for two consecutive weeks. It was certified double platinum for sales of over 40,000 copies.

With the song, Picasso also scored a Svensktoppen hit, charting between 13 January and 10 February 2008. It peaked at number three on the chart. It also charted at Trackslistan, peaking at number seven, while topping Digilistan.

The song was originally intended to have been performed at Melodifestivalen 2008 by Carola Häggkvist, who rejected the song during the autumn of 2007.

Track listing
CD single
"This Moment" – 3:36
"This Moment" [Instrumental] – 3:36

Charts

References

2007 singles
Number-one singles in Sweden
English-language Swedish songs
Marie Picasso songs
Songs written by Lina Eriksson
2007 songs
Sony BMG singles
Songs written by Mårten Eriksson